Amethyst is a campaign setting for the role-playing game Dungeons & Dragons, released for both the 3rd edition via the Open Gaming License and the D&D 4th edition via the Game System License. It is published by Dias Ex Machina, featuring the artwork of Nick Greenwood and Jaime Jones.

Rules

The game uses the Dungeons & Dragons 4th edition rules as a base, altering some of the rules to adapt to the setting and include things like vehicles and guns, making magic less powerful and additionally, it changes many of the ‘core’ classes by opening up new paths of advancement via the class focus system.

Additionally the game shares its combat rules with other future supplements of the same publisher and it is meant to be compatible with standard GSL rules.

Races
Separating itself further from the ‘classical’ fantasy game are the races playable. The setting focuses on the fact that the majority of the non-human races are fey, ranging from the short Narros (reminiscent of dwarves) to the various races that are far more elven in appearance, to the gnomish Gimfen, and even the vampiric Tilen. Even the demons the characters encounter are descendants of the Fey.

Technology and magic
The setting also takes into account the disruption of modern technology by magic; the more technologically advanced an item is, the more likely that the Enchantment Disruption Field that encompasses the globe will affect it. Rules in detail are provided for all facets of technological and magical interaction.

Other notes

Amethyst was originally published under 3.5 rules and recognized with an Honorable Mention for Best Setting in the 2008 Gen Con ENnie Awards. Amethyst: Foundations by Chris Dias was previewed at the Free RPG Day of 2009, and then published in 2010 by Goodman Games as a science fantasy setting for 4th edition Dungeons & Dragons. The 4E version of Amethyst was published under the GSL license from Wizards of the Coast, utilizing the Dungeons & Dragons Fourth Edition mechanics by Goodman Games.

References

External links
 Diasexmachina web page
 RPGNet Game info
 Goodman games preview page
 Artwork from Amethyst RPG
 Cover art for 3.5 edition

Dungeons & Dragons campaign settings